Northern village may refer to:

Northern village (Quebec), a municipal status type in Quebec, Canada
Northern village (Saskatchewan), a municipal status type in Saskatchewan, Canada